Patal-e Isin (also Romanized as Pātal-e Īsīn, Pā Tall-e Īsīn, and Pā-ye Tall-e Īsīn) is a village in Isin Rural District, in the Central District of Bandar Abbas County, Hormozgan Province, Iran. At the 2006 census, its population was 1,318, in 235 families.

References 

Populated places in Bandar Abbas County